Velyka Buda is a village in Chernivtsi Raion, Chernivtsi Oblast, Ukraine. It belongs to Ostrytsia rural hromada, one of the hromadas of Ukraine,

This village is mostly populated by Romanian speaking people.

Until 18 July 2020, Velyka Buda belonged to Hertsa Raion. The raion was abolished in July 2020 as part of the administrative reform of Ukraine, which reduced the number of raions of Chernivtsi Oblast to three. The area of Hertsa Raion was merged into Chernivtsi Raion.

References

Villages in Chernivtsi Raion